Jack Samani (born 7 May 1979) is a Solomon Islands footballer.

Samani plays as a winger for his current club PRK Hekari United in the Papua New Guinea National Club Championship after leaving Marist F.C in his native Solomon Islands.

He has also represented the Solomon Islands national football team on numerous occasions, making his debut in 2000 and collecting over 27 caps, scoring 6 goals.

Club history 
PRK Hekari United (2006-)
Marist F.C (2002–03, 2006)
Brisbane Wolves FC (2004–2005)

External links

References

1979 births
Living people
Solomon Islands footballers
Solomon Islands international footballers
Association football midfielders
Hekari United players
2000 OFC Nations Cup players
2002 OFC Nations Cup players
2004 OFC Nations Cup players
Solomon Islands expatriate footballers
Expatriate footballers in Papua New Guinea
Solomon Islands expatriate sportspeople in Papua New Guinea